Matteo Sansone (1916–1992) was born in Monte Sant'Angelo, Italy. He was educated as a pharmacist but described himself as "an archaeologist out of passion". He is known for his archaeological work in the Gargano region in Apulia, Italy.

References

1916 births
1992 deaths
Italian archaeologists
20th-century archaeologists